WXTY (99.9 FM) is an adult hits radio station in the Tallahassee, Florida market owned by Adams Radio Group. It is branded as "Tally 99.9". Its studios and transmitter are co-located in northeast Tallahassee.

History
On August 31, 2018 99.9 Hank-FM changed its name to Tally 99.9 to fit the format better and it changed its call sign from WANK to WXTY.

Former logo

References

External links

XTY
Adult hits radio stations in the United States
Radio stations established in 1990
1990 establishments in Florida